HMS Khartoum was a K-class destroyer of the Royal Navy, named after the capital of Sudan, Khartoum.

History
Khartoum was launched on 6 February 1939. Her initial action occurred on 19 December 1939, during deployment in the Firth of Clyde, when she was subject to an unsuccessful torpedo attack by a submarine near Holy Isle. She then carried out an anti-submarine search for 24 hours without success.  In February 1940, she was deployed for escort of convoys to Norway based at Rosyth where she sustained structural damage during anti-submarine operations at high speed in heavy weather and was sent to Falmouth for repair. On completion in May 1940, she took passage to come under the Commander-in-Chief, The Nore to help evacuate personnel from the Netherlands and Belgium but developed a machinery defect and was taken to Portsmouth for two days of repair, where her pennant number for visual signaling purposes changed to G45.
   
On 8 May she was nominated for service with the 14th Destroyer Flotilla in the Mediterranean Sea and on 16 May, took passage from Plymouth for Gibraltar with sister destroyer . On 23 May, they joined the flotilla at Alexandria, Egypt, and deployed for screening and patrol duties.
 
In June 1940, Khartoum deployed in the Red Sea with sloops of the East Indies Squadron and her other sister destroyers and prepared for war service in defense of Red Sea shipping. On 10 June, after the outbreak of war, she deployed for patrol and convoy defense based at Aden. Then, on 23 June, she was deployed with Kandahar, Kingston and the sloop  in search for Torricelli near Perim Island. After interception, Khartoum and these warships took part in a surface engagement with the submarine, during which Torricelli was sunk and Shoreham damaged. However, during the battle, Khartoum was hit by return fire which damaged the after torpedo tube mounting.

Loss
Some five and a half hours later, at 11.50am (local time), a torpedo's compressed air chamber exploded, propelling the warhead through the deck house of number 3 4.7-inch mount. and causing a serious uncontrollable fire from a ruptured oil tank there. This resulted in an explosion of the ship's magazine, killing one of the ship's company, injuring three others and wrecking the stern structure aft of the engine room while causing extensive flooding.  The ship beached on an even keel with forward structure awash and the ship's company was rescued by Kandahar and taken to Aden, Yemen.  Yeoman of Signals John Murphy was awarded a Mention in Despatches for his actions in securing the ship's code books.  The ship's equipment was dismantled and other security measures were implemented before the ship was abandoned. The shipwreck, in position 12º38'N, 43º24'E, remained visible after the end of World War II.

Confusion over cause of sinking
Some sources regard the damage from Torricelli (a hit in one area of the ship, followed by an explosion there later) as instrumental in Khartoums sinking.
Others regard it as coincidental, pointing to the five and a half hour time lag between the incidents. They also suggest her loss seems more due to inexperienced damage control.
The Admiralty inquest found the immediate cause of the loss was a torpedo air flask explosion which caused an uncontrollable fire and magazine explosion. It noted that similar incidents with the Mark IX torpedo had occurred on other ships. 
The inquest also ruled out damage from enemy action and sabotage.

References

Bibliography

External links
 HMS Khartoum - Loss due to defective torpedo air vessel, 23rd JUNE 1940
 HMS Khartoum (F45) on naval-history.net
 HMS Khartoum (F 45) on uboat.net
 A model of HMS Khartoum
 WW2 Losses: HMS Khartoum
 Warships Launched or Completed by N.E.Shipyards 1939–41

 

J, K and N-class destroyers of the Royal Navy
Ships built by Swan Hunter
Ships built on the River Tyne
1939 ships
World War II destroyers of the United Kingdom
World War II shipwrecks in the Indian Ocean
Maritime incidents in June 1940
Ship fires
Naval magazine explosions